Edward Guthlac Sergeant (3 December 1881, Crowland, Lincolnshire – 16 November 1961, Kingston upon Thames) was an English chess master.

He participated many times in the British Chess Championship, London City championship, and Hastings International Chess Congress. In 1907, he tied for 2nd-5th in London (British-ch, Henry Ernest Atkins won). He won or shared 1st at London 1913, London 1915/16 (won a playoff match against Theodor Germann), London 1916, Hastings 1919 (Minor), Bromley 1920, and Broadstairs 1921. He tied for 2nd-3rd with Harry Golombek at Brighton 1938 (British-ch, Conel Hugh O'Donel Alexander won).

He was a second cousin of Philip Walsingham Sergeant. In 1949 he was awarded the OBE in the Birthday Honours in recognition of his 39 years' service in the office of the Solicitor to the Board of Inland Revenue. He was the author of a leading work on Stamp Duty.

References

1881 births
1961 deaths
English chess players
People from Crowland